Poland does not use the euro as its currency. However, under the terms of their Treaty of Accession with the European Union, all new Member States "shall participate in the Economic and Monetary Union from the date of accession as a Member State with a derogation", which means that Poland is obliged to eventually replace its currency, the złoty, with the euro.

There is no target date for Polish euro adoption, and no fixed date for when the country will join ERM-II (the fifth euro convergence criterion).

Euro adoption will require the approval of at least two-thirds of the Sejm to make a constitutional amendment changing the official currency from the złoty to the euro. The ruling Law and Justice Party opposes euro adoption. Former PM Donald Tusk has said that he may agree to a referendum on euro participation in order to gain their support for a constitutional amendment. There is not yet any official information on the design process for the Polish national sides of the euro coins.

Political preparations for euro adoption

Prior to 2004 
Plans to join the eurozone began back in 2003 before the accession to the EU, when the contemporary premier Leszek Miller stated that Poland would join the eurozone between 2007 and 2009. One of the leaders of Civic Platform party (PO) Jan Rokita was certain that the best way to converge to euro was through a unilateral euroization. Nevertheless, euroization is against the rules of the EU and it cannot be adopted by any Member State without the approval of the Union. Lastly, the plan was not finalized and Poland suspended it.

2005–2007 
During the rule of the Law and Justice, Self-Defence of the Republic of Poland and League of Polish Families coalition, the euro was not a priority on Poland's agenda. In 2006 prime minister Kazimierz Marcinkiewicz stated that the accession to euro area was only possible after 2009, as the Polish deficit could decrease to 3% of GDP by the end of 2007. The negotiations about Poland joining the eurozone have been postponed. The then-prime minister Jarosław Kaczyński held an even more sceptical position. In his opinion the euro was disadvantageous for Poland, as it would cause an increase in prices and złoty would lose stability.

2008–2012 
The euro adoption process in Poland is regulated by the Strategic Framework for National Euro Changeover Plan (adopted by the Council of Ministers in 2010) and the National Euro Changeover Plan (approved in 2011 by the Committee for European Affairs). The plan comprises an economic impact assessment of the euro adoption, followed by a chapter on the measures needed to ensure Polish compliance with the "Maastricht convergence criteria", and finally a roadmap for the euro changeover process.

On 10 September 2008, speaking at the launch of an economic forum in a Polish resort of Krynica-Zdrój, Polish Prime Minister Donald Tusk announced the ruling government's objective to join the Eurozone in 2012, which was confirmed by the government on 28 October 2008. However, Poland's then President Lech Kaczynski wanted euro adoption put to a referendum. Finance Minister Dominik Radziwill said on 10 July 2009 that Poland could meet the fiscal criteria by 2012 and enter the Eurozone in 2014. On 5 November 2009, speaking at the news conference, Polish Deputy Finance Minister Ludwik Kotecki said the government may announce a national strategy for euro adoption in mid-2010. In an interview for Rzeczpospolita daily 22 October 2009 he also said Poland could adopt the euro in 2014 if the general government deficit is reduced in 2012. Former President Lech Kaczyński said at a news conference that Poland was unable to join Eurozone before 2015, and even that date was still very optimistic. Also, Polish government officials had confirmed that Poland wouldn't join Eurozone in 2012. On Friday, 11 December 2009, Polish Prime Minister Donald Tusk said Poland could join the eurozone in 2015. Speaking during Finance Ministry-organized seminar on the euro-adoption process on 15 December 2009, Deputy Minister of Finance Ludwik Kotecki said the year 2015 is more likely than 2014, however he declined to specify the official target date.

In the years following the 2008 global financial crisis, economic statistics showed that the devaluation of its floating currency the złoty led Polish products to become more competitively priced to foreign buyers, and because of that Poland had a higher economic GDP growth in subsequent years than if the country had been a part of the eurozone.  The Polish government advocated in 2012 that it would only be wise for Poland to join the eurozone once the euro crisis had ended, based on the argument that delaying their accession would minimise the risk for Poland to become one of the net financial creditors to other eurozone countries in financial difficulties.

In December 2011, Polish foreign minister Radosław Sikorski said that Poland aimed to adopt the euro on 1 January 2016, but only if "the eurozone is reformed by then, and the entrance is beneficial to us." The Polish government planned to comply with all the Euro convergence criteria by 2015. In autumn 2012 the Monetary Policy Council of the Polish National Bank published its official monetary guidelines for 2013, confirming earlier political statements that Poland should only join the ERM-II once the existing eurozone countries have overcome the current sovereign-debt crisis, to maximise the benefits of monetary integration and minimise associated costs. The governor of the National Bank, Marek Belka, has stated that the euro won't be adopted before the end of his term in 2016.

In late 2012, Tusk announced that he planned to launch a "national debate" on euro adoption the following spring, and in December 2012 Polish Finance Minister Jacek Rostowski said that his country should strive to adopt the euro as soon as possible.  On 21 December 2012, it was announced by the Ministry of Finance that they planned to update the country's National Euro Changeover Plan in 2013, mainly due to the recent institutional changes in the eurozone which require additional considerations. One of the key details investigated as part of the work to update the plan is whether or not an amendment to Article 227 of the Constitution of the Republic of Poland will need to be passed to change the currency from the Złoty to the euro and to enact changes to the central bank. The opposition Law and Justice Party opposes euro adoption and the governing parties do not have enough seats in the Sejm to make the required constitutional amendment. The Polish Finance Minister emphasised that the government's support for euro adoption remained unchanged as a strategic goal, and would not be changed in the updated plan. At the same time, however, recent turbulences in the EU and in the world have caused the government to adopt a kind of additional criterion for euro adoption, namely the stabilization of the euro area.

2013 – present 
In January 2013, Polish President Bronislaw Komorowski stated that a decision on euro adoption should not be made until after parliamentary and presidential elections scheduled for 2015, but that in the meantime the country should try to comply with the convergence criteria. In February 2013, Jaroslaw Kaczynski, leader of the Law and Justice Party stated that "I do not foresee any moment when the adoption of the euro would be advantageous for us" and called for a referendum on euro adoption. Rostowski has stated that Poland won't set a target date for the switch since the country first needs to carry out reforms to prepare itself. In March 2013, Tusk said for the first time that he would be open to considering a referendum on euro participation – decided by simple majority – provided that it was part of a package in which the parliament first approved the necessary constitutional amendment to adopt the euro subject to approval in a referendum. In April 2013 Marek Belka, head of National Bank of Poland, said that Poland should demand to be permitted to adopt the euro without first joining the ERM-II due to concerns over currency speculation. Following the 2014 Russian military intervention in Ukraine, Belka said that Poland needed to reevaluate its reluctance to join the eurozone. In June 2014, a joint statement by the finance minister, central bank chief and president of Poland stated that Poland should begin a debate shortly after the 2015 parliamentary elections about when to adopt the euro, leading to a roadmap decision that might even include identification of a target date.

In October 2014, the Deputy Prime Minister Janusz Piechociński suggested that Poland should join the Eurozone in 2020 at the earliest. The newly elect Prime Minister, Ewa Kopacz, having replaced Donald Tusk for the final year of the government's term, at the same time commented: "Before answering the question which target date should be set for the euro changeover, we must ask another: What is the situation of the eurozone and where are they going? If the eurozone will strengthen, then Poland should fulfill all the criteria for inclusion, which would in any case be good for the economy." The PM hereby referred to the earlier political decision of first letting the National Coordination Committee for Euro Changeover complete its update of the changeover plan, which await a prior establishment of the banking union, before setting a target date for euro adoption.  More recently, Krzysztof Szczerski, the foreign affairs advisor to Poland's new President Andrzej Duda, said in July 2015 that "Poles should decide in a referendum whether they want to embrace the euro".

In the 2015 Polish parliamentary election, the winning party became the eurosceptic Law and Justice, which opposes euro adoption. On 13 April 2019 at a convention, Jarosław Kaczyński, the leader of Law and Justice Party (PiS) stated: "We will adopt the euro someday, because we are committed to do so and we are and will be in the European Union, but we will accept it when it is in our interest". He came forth with a declaration, according to which the euro wouldn't be introduced until Poland's economy catches up with Western economies. In his view Poland should accept the euro only when the national economy will reach 85% of GDP per capita of Germany. Later on Jarosław Kaczyński and premier Mateusz Morawiecki maintain that convergence to euro at this point would be harmful for Poland.

The process for the introduction of the euro 
While Donald Tusk held the post of the premier in Poland first steps have been taken towards creation of the interinstitutional organizational structure for euro adoption. On 13 January 2009 a new body of Government Plenipotentiary for Euro Adoption in the Republic of Poland was established. The position of the first Government Plenipotentiary took Ludwik Kotecki.

Then, the next regulation from 3 November 2009 created new institutions:

 National Coordination Committee for Euro Changeover;
 Coordinating Council;
 Interinstitutional Working Committees for Preparation for the Introduction of the Euro by the Republic of Poland; and
 Task Groups.

According to Regulation of the Council of Ministers from 28 December 2015, the position of Government Plenipotentiary for Euro Adoption in Poland has been suspended.

Expected effects of the euro convergence 
The adoption of the euro in Poland has been the subject of economic analysis by Polish finance experts. In 2017, the Robert Schuman Foundation and Konrad Adenauer Foundation in Poland prepared a report of three possible scenarios as a result of Poland acceding to the euro area. According to the report, delaying introduction of the euro would be a net negative for Poland. Other research has included government reports drawn up by the Ministry of Finance in Poland in 2005 and two reports by the National Bank of Poland (NBP) in 2004 and 2009. The NBP report from 2009 concluded that in the long-term, Poland's GDP would expand by an extra 7.5% if it became a member of the eurozone, with most of that benefit coming in the first 10 years after joining. In a 2014 analysis, the NBP stated that in the wake of the eurozone crisis, "The chance of accelerating economic growth in Poland as a result of adopting the euro depends on whether the institutions of the euro area and the potential of the Polish economy are strengthened."

Expected positive effects include:

 direct benefits
 reduction of exchange rate risk and costs of transactions – 80% of Polish trade is settled in the euro. Due to exchange rate risk many entrepreneurs uncertain of the profits and transaction costs do not engage into international operations;
 lower business costs;
 improved quality in the estimation of profitability of investment projects;
 better transparency and comparability of prices in the international perspective;
 improved position of Poland as a trading partner;
 enhanced macroeconomic stability; 
 limited risk of speculation of the currency;
 lower risk of a currency crisis;
 increase in the credibility of monetary policy;
 improvement in credit ranking;
 decline in interest rates;
 a decrease in the cost of raising capital for households, enterprises and public institutions;
 simpler credit availability and related to it increase in consumption;
 improvement of service interest;
 growth of trade
 increase investments – both in domestic investments and foreign direct investments (FDI)
 financial integration;
 growth of GDP and welfare.

The reports note that part of the possible positive effects is contingent on an execution of changes, such as a reform of public finance or reduction of public debt.

On the other side, the team of NBP analysts lists possible negative effects of the convergence to the euro:

 long-term costs
 loss of monetary policy independence – transfer to the EU level;
 loss of the possibility of using the exchange rate as a tool of adjustment policy;
 medium-term risks
 nonoptimal conversion rate;
 risk of deterioration of competitiveness;
 inflation differential within the monetary union;
 asset price inflation;
 Short-term risks and costs
 risks associated with convergence criteria – inter alia with an accession to the ESM II and a risk of the Mundell's trilemma ;
 short-term price effects and the associated negative consequences of the euro illusion;
 price effects regarding the introduction of the euro into cash circulation;
 euro coins and banknotes supplies – as the euro is already available in cash, the cost of conversion would be lower;
 adaptation of IT systems;
 preparation and implementation of a nationwide information campaign on the euro.

Public opinion

Eurobarometer
Public support for the euro in Poland by each Eurobarometer survey

Other surveys
In 2010, the Eurozone's debt crisis caused Poles' interest to cool, with two out of five Poles opposed to entry. In March 2011, research by CBOS showed that 60% of Poles were against adopting the euro while 32% were supportive, a decrease from 41% in April 2010. Surveys in the first half of 2012 indicated that 60% of Poles were opposed to adopting the common currency. Public support for the euro continued to fall, reaching record lows in the CBOS polls from July 2012, where only 25% of those polled supported a switch to the euro. However, polls conducted by TNS Polska throughout 2012–2015 have consistently shown support for eventually adopting the euro, though that support depends on the target date (as revealed by the detailed data in the table below).

The Eurobarometer poll does not take adoption timing issues into concern, meaning that this result can not be directly compared to the above results of the TNS Polska surveys, as a percentage of those being surveyed might respond with a more negative bias (assuming the survey question is about if they favour adoption now" rather than favour "adoption either now or at a later point of time perceived as being more optimal for their country").

The adoption support found by the 2012–15 surveys in the above table, was detected while a majority of Poles in the same surveys said they expected the euro adoption would negatively impact the Polish economy. In example, 58% of the surveyed in May 2012 had this belief. A later poll for the German Marshall Fund published in September 2012, even found 71% of Poles believed an immediate switch to the euro would be bad for the Polish economy.

Convergence criteria
The Maastricht Treaty originally required that all members of the European Union join the euro once certain economic criteria are met. As of May 2018, Poland met 2 out of the 5 criteria.

Convergence Reports 
Since 1989, the European Commission and ECB prepare Convergence Reports on countries that do not participate in the euro area. According to Article 140 TFEU, at least once every 2 years Reports must be issued on Member States that did not join the eurozone.

Reports cover:

 legal compatibility;
 price stability;
 public finances;
 exchange rate stability;
 long-term interest rates; and
 additional factors.

The report of 2018 verify that Poland meets 2 out of 4 economic criteria related to price stability and public finances. Poland does not meet 2 criteria of exchange rate stability and long-term interest rates. Moreover, Polish law is not completely compatible with the EU Treaties. The NBP Act and the Constitution of the Republic of Poland are not fully compatible with the Article 131 of the TFEU, which is related to lack of political approval in Poland. In order to fulfil legal compatibility Poland has to change three articles of the Constitution. First article to be changed is Article 227(1), which improperly defines the main goal of the National Bank of Poland. Secondly, Article 203(1) of the Constitution defines too broadly the competences of the Supreme Audit Office towards the National Bank. Finally, according to Article 198(1), President of the NBP carries responsibility before the State Tribunal, which is against requirements of the independence of the national central bank.

See also 
 
 Enlargement of the eurozone
 Poland in the European Union

Notes

References

Euro coins
Euro by country
Euro